The 1930 Nobel Prize in Literature was awarded to the American novelist Sinclair Lewis (1885–1951) "for his vigorous and graphic art of description and his ability to create, with wit and humour, new types of characters." He is the first American Nobel laureate in literature.

Laureate

Sinclair Lewis was a prolific author having written 24 novels, more than 70 short stories, several plays and poetry collections. He is well known for the satirical novels Main Street (1920), Babbitt (1922), Dodsworth (1929), and It Can't Happen Here (1935) – all of which critical acknowledgments of American capitalism and materialism in the interwar period. His 1920 novel became a commercial success but did not win a Pulitzer Prize, which disappointed Lewis much that he declined the Pulitzer Prize when it was awarded to his novel Arrowsmith in 1925.

Deliberations

Nominations
Lewis had not been nominated before for the prize, making him one of the laureates who won on a rare occasion when they have been awarded the Nobel Prize in Literature the same year they were first nominated. He received only one nomination from Swedish Academy member Henrik Schück (1855–1947).

In total, the Swedish Academy's Nobel Committee received 47 nominations for 30 individuals. Thirteen of the authors were first-time nominated among them Theodore Dreiser, Edgar Lee Masters, Frans Eemil Sillanpää (awarded in 1939), Arvid Järnefelt, Paul Valéry, Lion Feuchtwanger, Rudolf Kassner, and Clotilde Crespo de Arvelo. The highest number of nomination was for the French poet and essayist Paul Valéry with six nominations. There were three female nominees: Concha Espina de la Serna, Clotilde Crespo de Arvelo and Edith Wharton.

The authors Arthur St John Adcock, Vladimir Arsenyev, Florence Bell, Edward Bok, Alice Williams Brotherton, Mary Whiton Calkins, Herbert Croly, Georges de Porto-Riche, Arthur Conan Doyle, Florbela Espanca, Mary Eleanor Wilkins Freeman, Thomas Nicoll Hepburn, Pavlos Karolidis, D. H. Lawrence, William John Locke, Vladimir Mayakovsky, Olena Pchilka, Maria Polydouri, Marion Manville Pope, George Haven Putnam, Karam Singh, Arthur Way, Lucien Wolf, Joseph Wright, and Manuel Zeno Gandía died in 1930 without having been nominated for the prize.

Reactions
The choice of Sinclair Lewis received mixed reactions. The British and European press were, in general, favourable. But in the United States reactions among critics and commentators were largely negative, dismissing Lewis' writing artistically and politically.

Notes

References

External links
Presentation Speech by Erik Axel Karlfeldt nobelprize.org

1930